The Minor Basilica of Our Lady of Luján is a Roman Catholic church building in Luján, Buenos Aires, Argentina.

Built in Neogothic style, it is dedicated to Our Lady of Luján, patron saint of Argentina.

Many people mistake this temple for a cathedral. Actually, it is part of the Roman Catholic Archdiocese of Mercedes-Luján, whose see is located at the Cathedral Basilica of Mercedes-Luján in the neighboring city of Mercedes.

References

External links
 
 Basílica Nacional Nuestra Señora de Luján - Arzobispado de Mercedes-Luján.

Basilica churches in Argentina
Gothic Revival church buildings in Argentina
Tourist attractions in Buenos Aires Province
Catholic pilgrimage sites
Roman Catholic churches completed in 1935
Luján, Buenos Aires
Roman Catholic shrines in Argentina
20th-century Roman Catholic church buildings in Argentina